Butterbeans and Susie were an American comedy duo comprising Jodie Edwards (July 19, 1893 – October 28, 1967) and Susie Edwards (née Hawthorne; December 1894 – December 5, 1963). They married in 1917, and performed together until the early 1960s.  Their act, a combination of marital quarrels, comic dances, and racy singing, proved popular on the Theatre Owners Booking Association (TOBA) tour. They later moved to vaudeville and appeared for a time with the blackface minstrel troupe the Rabbit's Foot Company.

Career

Early career and marriage
Edwards began his career in 1910 as a singer and dancer. Hawthorne performed in African-American theater. The two met in 1916, when Hawthorne was in the chorus of the show Smart Set. They married onstage the next year.

The two began performing as a comic team. They had been touring with the Theatre Owners Booking Association (TOBA) with an African-American husband-and-wife comedy team, Stringbeans and Sweetie May. Upon the death of Stringbeans (Butler May) in 1917, a TOBA promoter asked Edwards to take the stage name Butterbeans and, with his wife, take over Stringbeans and Sweetie May's act. Butterbeans and Susie appeared for the first time shortly thereafter.

Comedy act

Butterbeans and Susie's act played up the differences between the two. Susie wore elegant dresses and presented an air of composure and sexiness. Butterbeans, in contrast, played the fool, with his too-small pants and bowler hat, bow tie, tailcoat, and floppy shoes. He was loudly belligerent: "I'd whip your head every time you breathe; rough treatment is exactly what you need." However, his pugnaciousness was belied by a happy demeanor and an inability to resist Susie's charms.

Whereas Stringbeans and Sweetie May stressed song and dance, Butterbeans and Susie emphasized comedy with content that was frowned on by moralists. The typical act featured a duet, a blues song by Susie, a cakewalk dance, and a comedy sketch. Short bouts of bickering peppered the act. The humor often concerned marriage or occasionally black life in general. One of their more popular numbers was "A Married Man's a Fool If He Thinks His Wife Don't Love Nobody but Him". The act was risqué at times. One of their more popular comic songs was Susie's saucy "I Want a Hot Dog for My Roll", full of racy double entendres:

Well I want a dog without bread you see.
Because I carries [sic] my bread with me.
. . .
Give me a big one, that's what I say.
I want it so it will fit my bread.

The song was accompanied by Susie's provocative dancing and Buttberbeans's call-and-response one-liners: "My dog's never cold!" "Here's a dog that's long and lean." "I Want a Hot Dog for My Roll" was one of the few songs that Okeh refused to release.

The act usually ended with a song by Susie that showed that the two really were happily married, followed by Butterbeans's trademark song-and-dance number, "The Heebie Jeebies" or "The Itch". During this dance, Butterbeans thrust his hands in his pockets and began to scratch himself in time with the music. As the tempo increased, he pulled the hands back out and scratched the rest of his body. According to Stearns, this was the moment when the audience "flipped".

Recordings and film
Butterbeans and Susie made several recordings of blues songs interspersed with comic banter for Okeh Records between 1924 and 1930.

In 1926, they made a recording with Louis Armstrong's Hot Five, a mildly salacious blues number called "He Likes It Slow".

In 1960, they issued an album on King Records' Festival label (FRC-7000).

78 RPM Singles - OKeh Records

Legacy
Butterbeans and Susie used their fame and influence to help younger black comedians. After seeing Moms Mabley in Dallas, for example, they helped her gain acceptance at better venues. Even after leaving show business, they remained friends with many black entertainers and put up down-on-their-luck comedians in their Chicago home. Stepin Fetchit stayed with them at some point in the 1950s or 1960s.

Susie Edwards died on December 5, 1963.  Jody (Butterbeans) Edwards died on October 28, 1967 at the Dorchester Inn outside of Chicago IL.

References

Bibliography
Harris, Sheldon (1994). Blues Who's Who. Rev. ed. New York: Da Capo Press. 
Watkins, Mel (1994). On the Real Side: Laughing, Lying, and Signifying—The Underground Tradition of African-American Humor That Transformed American Culture, from Slavery to Richard Pryor. New York: Simon & Schuster.

20th-century American comedians
20th-century American dancers
20th-century African-American singers
African-American comedians
American blues singers
American comedy duos
American dance groups
Blackface minstrel performers
Okeh Records artists
Vaudeville performers
Comedy musicians
Comedy theatre characters
Theatre characters introduced in 1917
Male characters in theatre
Female characters in theatre
Married couples